The Royal Norwegian Ministry of Defence is a Norwegian government ministry in charge of the formation and implementation of national security and defence policy, and for the overall management and control of the activities of subordinate agencies. The ministry is located at Glacisgata 1, Oslo, inside Akershus festning. The ministry is headed by the politically appointed Minister of Defence, currently Bjørn Arild Gram. The ministry controls a large group of defence-related agencies, not to be related with Ministry of Foreign Affairs that controls all intelligence-related agencies in the country.

Core tasks 
 Strategic analysis, research and development (R&D)
 The development of long-term policy including future strategic concepts and doctrines
 Perspective and structural planning
 Planning, budgeting and implementation in the medium and short term
 Overall management of agencies' activities during the budget year
 Operational policy, planning and management at a strategic level
 Exercise policy, planning and management at a strategic level
 Emergency planning, policy and management at a strategic level
 Crisis management
 Development and implementation of security policy, both nationally  and internationally
 Development of defence cooperation with allied- and partner countries
 Strategic personnel management
 Information, communication and press relations
 Strategic leadership and management in the field of ICT
 Organisational development
 Preventive security at a strategic level
 Legal questions
 Controller / Internal audit
 Internal administration

Departments 
 Executive Secretariat
On behalf of the Secretary General, the secretariat prepares, quality-assures, coordinates and priorities all issues that are submitted to the Minister. Accordingly, the secretariat maintains overall responsibility for the Minister's activities. 
 The Ministry of Defence Communications Unit
The unit provides support both to the Minister and senior staff, both political and administrative, and to the Chief of Defence. The spokesman function is performed by separate spokesmen for the Minister of Defence and the Chief of Defence. 
 Internal Auditor Unit
The Internal Auditor will contribute to the overall achievement of defence objectives by providing support to the Ministry's senior management in controlling and managing subordinate departments and agencies. 
 The Department of Personnel and General Services
The Department of Personnel and General Services spans over a range of different professional areas, some administrative and some more related to aspects of development. Some of the department's tasks are purely internal while others, for example personnel policy and common legal services, entail responsibilities across the sector as a whole.
 The Department of Security Policy
The Department of Security Policy is responsible for the handling of questions of security policy as well as for the Ministry's international activities and external relations in the field of security policy. 
 The Department of Management and Financial Governance
The Department of Management and Financial Governance has the overall responsibility for the planning and development of activities, the organisation and the structure of the Armed Forces within the particular long-term planning period. The department also exercises overall management and control of the activities of subordinate agencies. 
 The Department of Defence Policy and Long-Term Planning
The Department of Defence Policy and Long-Term Planning is responsible for strategic analysis, the development of long-term defence policy and overall planning for the defence sector.

See also 
List of Norwegian Ministers of Defence
Norwegian Armed Forces

References

External links 
Ministry of Defence

Defence
Ministry of Defence
Norway
Norway, Defence
1814 establishments in Norway
NATO defence ministries